The Fullerton Line was an interurban route of the Pacific Electric Railway. It ran between Downtown Los Angeles and Fullerton, California. It opened in 1917 and saw freight service until the 1940s.

History
The line, among the electric railway's final expansions, was not originally intended for passenger service unless a connection to Orange was completed. Despite this, the route was opened for service in 1917. Pacific Electric spent $425,000 on the extension from La Habra to Fullerton ($ in  adjusted for inflation).

In 1935, PE reported losses on the line of $1,610 for travel in the previous year. PE discontinued passenger service on the line on January 22, 1938. Landowners along the line petitioned for its closure in 1939, but freight traffic on the line continued until the late 1940s.

One of the more prominent landmarks on the line was a concrete arch bridge over Harbor Boulevard that was emblazoned with a message welcoming visitors to Fullerton.  The bridge was razed in 1964 to ease clearances for trucks.

Part of the former line became a section of the Juanita Cooke Greenbelt & Trail. The West Santa Ana Branch Transit Corridor light rail project is expected to use a section of the line between Slauson and the former Los Angeles and Salt Lake Railroad right of way.

Route
The Fullerton Line followed the Long Beach Line from Los Angeles south to Slauson Junction (south of Slauson Boulevard) where it branched off in an easterly direction to Whittier and Yorba Linda. From there, the double track line ran easterly, in private way between dual roadways of Randolph Street, through Huntington Park, Vernon, Bell, and Maywood to reach the Los Angeles River. Crossing the river, the double track in private way followed intermittent sections of Randolph Street through Bell Gardens and Commerce, and crossed the Rio Hondo south of Slauson Avenue.

The line continued easterly, south and parallel to, Slauson Avenue. Across the Pico Rivera area and the San Gabriel River into Los Nietos, where the line crossed the Atchison, Topeka and Santa Fe Railway Third District main line (Los Nietos) at Norwalk Boulevard. The single track La Habra–Fullerton–Yorba Linda Line branched easterly in private way off the Whittier Line at Los Nietos, crossed Norwalk Boulevard and went through Whittier at the south edge of the city limits. After crossing Mills Avenue the track ran adjacent to and north of Lambert Road until crossing 1st Street. Here the line turned easterly through La Habra to Laon Junction (3rd Avenue at College Street), where the single track Fullerton Line branched to the south.

List of major stations

Notes

References 

Pacific Electric routes
Railway lines opened in 1917
1917 establishments in California
Railway lines closed in 1938
1938 disestablishments in California
Fullerton, California
Closed railway lines in the United States